The 1911 Isle of Man Tourist Trophy races took place for the first time over the Isle of Man TT Mountain Course. The whole organisation of the races was given over to the Auto-Cycle Union (ACU), which announced the use of the longer mountain course with a four lap (150 mile) Junior race on Friday 30 June, and five laps (189 mile) for the Senior race on Monday 3 July. In only five years the TT races had matured and commercialism had set-in. Grandstands were built by the Douglas Corporation in what had been popular and free vantage points in Douglas, to the displeasure of the public.

Preparations for this new, challenging course that meant an eight-mile (13 km) uphill climb from Ramsey to Brandywell prompted the manufacturers to devise methods of modifying their mainly single-gear machines to cope with the Snaefell mountain road not once, but several times. Harry Collier, on the single-cylinder Matchless, and Percy J. Evans fought for first place in the Junior event. In the Senior event, British pride and prestige was dented when the Indians took the first three places. Charlie Collier crossed the finish line second on his Matchless, but was disqualified for refuelling outside of the designated area.

On Friday, June 27, 1911, the first fatal accident in connection with the Tourist Trophy races happened. While practicing for the forthcoming race, Victor Surridge was taking a difficult corner on Cregwilly’s Hill near Glen Helen section of the course, dashing into a hedge and breaking his neck. He was nineteen years of age.

Junior TT final standings 
Friday 30 June 1911 – 4 laps (150 miles) Four Inch Course/Isle of Man TT Mountain Course

Senior TT final standings 
Monday 3 July 1911 – 5 laps (187 miles 4 furlongs) Four Inch Course/Isle of Man TT Mountain Course

References

External links 
 1911 Isle of Man TT results

Isle
1911 in motorsport
1911